Waihilau Falls is a waterfall in the Waimanu Valley, in the U.S. state of Hawaii on the island of Hawaii, the state's biggest and youngest island. It consists of three slender threads of water falling down through lush greenery.

See also
List of waterfalls by height

References

Waterfalls of Hawaii (island)
Horsetail waterfalls